Kachijhuli Sporting Club is a professional Bangladeshi Women's association football club from Mymensingh. The club was founded on 2021 and currently plays in Bangladesh Women's Football League.

History
The club was established in 20 March 2021 ahead of 2020–21 Bangladesh Women's Football League. The club performance was not good in their inaugural season. The second   phase of the league the club were expelled from due to absence three matches in a row. In the 2020–21 edition they have finished 7th position of 8 participants. 2021–22 season they are not participate in the league.

Players
Kachijhuli Sporting Club squad for 2020–21 season.

BWFL performance by year

Top goalscorers by season

Head coach records

Current technical staff
As of February 2021

References

2021 establishments in Bangladesh
Association football clubs established in 2021
Women's football clubs in Bangladesh